is a Japanese independent record label founded in 1986 by Color vocalist Hiroshi "Dynamite Tommy" Tomioka, with branches predominantly in Japan and the United States, as well as previously in Europe. It also continues to co-manage many of its artists after they have signed recording contracts with a major record label. Free-Will along with Extasy Records are credited with helping to spread the visual kei movement. Free-Will also produced the 2001 anime adaptation of the long running manga series Grappler Baki.

Sub-divisions

The company operates several sub-divisions, some of them for a single band or purpose only. For example, Firewall Div. solely handles material which is released in collaboration with Sony Music.

Under Sony Music
 Back Coat – 12012
 Firewall Div. – Dir en grey, Merry
 Lizard – Kagerou

Under King Records
 PS Company – Kra
 Indie PSC – Born
 S'Cube – Baroque, Eile de Mu, Puppet Mammy, Ruvie, Tokyo Michael, Cooky

Under Tokuma Japan Communications
 PS Company – D=Out, Screw

Under Avex Group
 ism – Kannivalism

Bands or solo artists managed directly

Past
 Alice Nine
 Amphibian
 BIS
 Bellzlleb
 Billy & The Sluts
 By-Sexual
 Color
 Decameron
 DECAYS
 Dir En Grey
 Genkaku Allergy
 Gilles de Rais
 Kagrra,
 Kamaitachi
 Lovemania
 Miyavi
 Red Tail Cat
 Rentrer en Soi
 Sea Monkey
 Speed-ID
 SuG
 sukekiyo
The Gazette 
 ViViD
 Vogue
 Youka

Scandal
On September 14, 2007, the label's founder Hiroshi "Dynamite Tommy" Tomioka was arrested, along with fellow Free-Will official Kazunori Murasaki and Koichi Kaku, a former employee of the Asatsu-DK advertising agency. The trio is accused of defrauding Asatsu-DK of 324 million yen (approximately US$2.8 million) by placing false orders for materials for Dir en grey. Kaku has since confessed to the charges, while Tomioka denied any involvement.

References

External links
 Official website
 PS Company website

Japanese independent record labels
Rock record labels
Punk record labels
Heavy metal record labels
Record labels established in 1986
1986 establishments in Japan